The 2008 Philippine Basketball Association (PBA) rookie draft was an event at which teams drafted players from the amateur ranks. The event was held at Market! Market! in Taguig on August 31, 2008. The Rain or Shine Elasto Painters (formerly known as the Welcoat Dragons) selected Gabe Norwood of the George Mason University as the number one draft pick. Players applied for the draft had undergone a two-day rookie camp.

Round 1

Round 2

Undrafted players

Draft-day trades
Jay Washington was traded to the San Miguel Beermen for the rights of Talk 'N Text's third overall pick.

Off-season trades
 Joe Devance (Rain or Shine Elasto Painters) and 2 second-round picks was traded to Alaska Aces for Solomon Mercado & Eddie Laure

Note
*All aspirants are Filipinos until proven otherwise.

External links
 PBA.ph

Philippine Basketball Association draft
Draft